Ezzrett "Sugarfoot" Anderson (February 10, 1920 – March 8, 2017) was an all-star professional Canadian football player.

Biography
Anderson graduated from Kentucky State and turned pro in 1945 and 1946 with the Hollywood Bears in the Pacific Coast Football League (along with Chuck Anderson, who would also later play pro in Canada). After playing with the Los Angeles Dons of the All-America Football Conference in 1947, catching 11 passes for 126 yards and scoring one touchdown, he began a 6-year stay with the Calgary Stampeders of the Western Interprovincial Football Union. As a Stamp he caught 116 passes for 1576 yards and made 5 TDs, with his best year being 1950, when he caught 46 passes for 673 yards. He retired in 1954.

Following in the footsteps of Herb Trawick, he was among the first African-American players in the Canadian professional leagues. In 1990, he was inducted into the Calgary Stampeders Wall of Fame. He died on March 8, 2017, at the age of 97.

He was married to Virnetta Anderson, who was elected to Calgary City Council in 1974 as the city's first Black municipal councillor.

Forever in our hearts, Ezzrett "Sugarfoot" Anderson, beloved family patriarch and legendary Calgarian passed away on Wednesday, March 8, 2017, at the Foothills Hospital. Sugarfoot, whose gridiron nickname became a lifelong signature, lived a full and fruitful 97 years. He was born in Nashville, Arkansas, on February 10, 1920, to parents Florence and Ezzrett Anderson Sr. a renowned baseball player in the old Negro Leagues.His was a sporting life which started in his early school years and continued at Kentucky State where he earned a spot on an all-America football team. While there he met his first wife Virnetta, from Hot Springs Arkansas. In 1943 they joined their extended family in moving to California to help with the war effort. "Sug", as he was often called, was a two-way star who could pass, catch and defend. He soon attracted the attention of the pros, playing with the Hollywood Bears of the Pacific Coast League in 1945-46 and the Los Angeles Dons of the All-America Football Conference in 1947. During those years Sugarfoot also found work in the movie industry, appearing in over 20 films, including a speaking role in the original "Story of Seabiscuit" with Shirley Temple and Barry Fitzgerald.In 1949, the Calgary Stampeders like many CFL team were seeking to bolster the Canadian game with some experienced U.S. talent. And, though Sugarfoot had retired from play, he was persuaded by old friend Woody Strode and storied coach Les Lear to bring his speed and versatility to Calgary. He became an instant star and popular figure both on and off the field for his talent, easygoing style and affable, bigger-than-life personality. He was an all-star CFL player in '49 when the Stamps lost to the Montreal Alouettes in the Grey Cup and was one of only two Americans to make all-pro in Canada at both offence and defense. And the only player in franchise history to wear the iconic "00". He retired at the end of 1955, was added to the Stampeders' Wall of Fame in 1990 and inducted into the Alberta Sports Hall of Fame in 2010.His years off the field were no less colourful. From 1950 to 1955 Sugarfoot had a popular radio show on CKXL, fronted a blues band called "The Bluenotes", and made many appearances on stage and at events supporting charities and enriching Calgary's culture and music scene. In 2013 he was presented with the "Canada's Recording Legacy Award of Recognition".Sugarfoot attended SAIT (Southern Alberta Institute of Technology), where he received his Red Seal as a Heavy Duty mechanic. He owned his own service station in the heart of downtown Calgary and went on to work for the group of companies that included Standard General, Inland Cement and Genstar retiring after 32 years.Sugarfoot always maintained his connection to the Stampeders: spending many years as an account representative and ambassador for the team "which allowed him to collect what had eluded him during his playing days 5 treasured Grey Cup rings. He was a fixture at McMahon Stadium a respected elder statesman and mentor from the practice field to the locker room and a tireless promoter at team events, with the Calgary Stampeders Alumni Association and all around town. Sugar always appreciated the opportunities provided him by the Stamps and his adopted city, and he was never happier than when he was out in public, meeting new people, telling stories and sharing his unique humour. Of course, the family will remember him most for our private joy his love of fatherhood, and the great and special love he shared for over 30 years with his devoted wife Anne English. Ezzrett is also survived by sons Barry and John, granddaughters Camille, Desta, Sonja, Vinessa, Jacquilyn and Nikki, grandsons Jonathan and Mark and many extended family and friends. He is pre-deceased by his first wife Virnetta and son Vaughn.Sugarfoot stayed active well into his 90's.

References

External links
Anderson bio at Alberta's Black Pioneer Heritage
Just Sports Stats

1920 births
2017 deaths
American football ends
Canadian football ends
African-American players of American football
African-American players of Canadian football
Kentucky State Thorobreds football players
Los Angeles Dons players
Calgary Stampeders players
Players of American football from Arkansas
People from Nashville, Arkansas
Black Canadian players of Canadian football
American emigrants to Canada
Canadian football people from Calgary
Sportspeople from Nashville, Tennessee
20th-century African-American sportspeople
21st-century African-American people